Sapekhati College, established in 1988, is a major and general degree college situated at Sapekhati, Charaideo district, Assam, India. This college is affiliated with the Dibrugarh University.

Departments

Arts
Assamese
English
History
Education
Economics
Philosophy
Political Science
Sociology

References

External links
 

Universities and colleges in Assam
Colleges affiliated to Dibrugarh University
Educational institutions established in 1988
1988 establishments in Assam